Lilieyen Santos (born November 20, 1992), better known as Yen Santos, is a Filipino actress. She debuted on the reality show Pinoy Big Brother: Teen Clash 2010, and gained mainstream recognition in Pure Love, a Philippine drama adaptation of the Korean drama 49 Days. She won the Best Actress award at the Gawad Urian Awards 2022 for the film A Faraway Land.

Personal life
Santos was born and raised in Cabanatuan. In 2010, she joined Pinoy Big Brother: Teen Clash 2010 where she was one of the housemates; she was evicted on Day 43.

She is in a relationship with actor Paolo Contis, her co-star in A Faraway Land.

Filmography

Television

Film

Awards and recognitions

References

External links
 

1992 births
ABS-CBN personalities
Actresses from Nueva Ecija
Filipino film actresses
Filipino television actresses
Living people
People from Cabanatuan
Pinoy Big Brother contestants
Star Magic